Okra or okro, Abelmoschus esculentus, known in many English-speaking countries as ladies' fingers or ochro, is a flowering plant in the mallow family. It has edible green seed pods. The geographical origin of okra is disputed, with supporters of West African, Ethiopian, Southeast Asian, and South Asian origins. Cultivated in tropical, subtropical, and warm temperate regions around the world, okra is used in the cuisines of many countries.

Etymology
Abelmoschus is New Latin from Arabic أَبُو المِسْك (ʾabū l-misk, "father of musk"), while esculentus is Latin for being fit for human consumption.

The first use of the word okra (alternatively; okro or ochro) appeared in 1679 in the Colony of Virginia, deriving from the Igbo word . The word gumbo was first used in American vernacular around 1805, deriving from Louisiana Creole, but originates from either the Umbundu word ochinggômbo or the Kimbundu word ki-ngombo. Despite the fact that in most of the United States the word gumbo often refers to the dish, gumbo, many places in the Deep South may have used it to refer to the pods and plant as well as many other variants of the word found across the African diaspora in the Americas.

Origin and distribution 

Okra is an allopolyploid of uncertain parentage. However, proposed parents include Abelmoschus ficulneus, A. tuberculatus and a reported "diploid" form of okra. Truly wild (as opposed to naturalised) populations are not known with certainty, and the West African variety has been described as a cultigen.  

The geographical origin of okra is disputed, with supporters of Southeast Asian, South Asian, Ethiopian and West African origins. The Egyptians and Moors of the 12th and 13th centuries used the Arabic word for the plant, bamya, suggesting it had come into Egypt from Arabia, but earlier it was probably taken from Ethiopia to Arabia. The plant may have entered southwest Asia across the Red Sea or the Bab-el-Mandeb strait to the Arabian Peninsula, rather than north across the Sahara, or from India. One of the earliest European accounts is by a Spanish Moor who visited Egypt in 1216 and described the plant under cultivation by the locals who ate the tender, young pods with meal. From Arabia, the plant spread around the shores of the Mediterranean Sea and eastward.

 The plant was introduced to the Americas by ships plying the Atlantic slave trade by 1658, when its presence was recorded in Brazil. It was further documented in Suriname in 1686. Okra may have been introduced to southeastern North America from Africa in the early 18th century. By 1748, it was being grown as far north as Philadelphia. Thomas Jefferson noted it was well established in Virginia by 1781. It was commonplace throughout the Southern United States by 1800, and the first mention of different cultivars was in 1806.

Botany and cultivation 

As a member of the Malvaceae, it is related to such species as cotton, cocoa, and hibiscus. The pollens are spherical and approximately 188 microns in diameter.

Abelmoschus esculentus is cultivated throughout the tropical and warm temperate regions of the world for its fibrous fruits or pods containing round, white seeds. It is among the most heat- and drought-tolerant vegetable species in the world and will tolerate soils with heavy clay and intermittent moisture, but frost can damage the pods. It prefers a soil temperature of at least  for germination, which occurs between six days (soaked seeds) and three weeks. As a tropical plant, it also requires a lot of sunlight, and it should also be cultivated in soil that has a pH between 5.8 and 7, ideally on the acidic side. Seedlings require ample water. The seed pods rapidly become fibrous and woody and, to be edible as a vegetable, must be harvested when immature, usually within a week after pollination.

The most common disease afflicting the okra plant is verticillium wilt, often causing a yellowing and wilting of the leaves. Other diseases include powdery mildew in dry tropical regions, leaf spots, yellow mosaic and root-knot nematodes. Resistance to yellow mosaic virus in A. esculentus was transferred through a cross with Abelmoschus manihot and resulted in a new variety called Parbhani kranti.

In the United States much of the supply is grown in Florida, especially around Dade in southern Florida. Okra is grown throughout the state to some degree, so okra is available ten months of the year. The Regional IPM Centers provide integrated pest management plans for use in the state.

Production 

In 2021, world production of okra was over 10.8 million tonnes, led by India (about 60%), Nigeria (about 18%), and Mali (over 6%); see table.

Food and uses

Pods

The pods of the plant are mucilaginous, resulting in the characteristic "goo" or slime when the seed pods are cooked; the mucilage contains soluble fiber. One possible way to de-slime okra is to cook it with an acidic food, such as tomatoes, to minimize the mucilage. Pods are cooked, pickled, eaten raw, or included in salads. Okra may be used in developing countries to mitigate malnutrition and alleviate food insecurity.

In cuisine

Okra is one of three thickeners that may be used in gumbo soup from Louisiana. In Cuba and Puerto Rico, the vegetable is referred to as quimbombó, and is used in dishes such as quimbombó guisado (stewed okra), a dish very similar to gumbo. It is also used in traditional dishes in the Dominican Republic, where it is called molondrón.
In the Brazilian state of Bahia, okra is known as quiabo and is used to prepare caruru, a dish of cultural and religious importance - in addition to being a symbol of Afro-Brazilian cuisine. 
In South Asia, the pods are used in many spicy vegetable preparations as well as cooked with beef, mutton, lamb and chicken.

Nutrition 
Raw okra contains 90% water, 2% protein, 7% carbohydrates and negligible fat. In a 100 gram reference amount, raw okra is a rich source (20% or more of the Daily Value, DV) of dietary fiber, vitamin C, and vitamin K, with moderate contents of thiamin, folate and magnesium (table).

Leaves and seeds 
Young okra leaves may be cooked similarly to the greens of beets or dandelions, or used in salads. Okra seeds may be roasted and ground to form a caffeine-free substitute for coffee. When importation of coffee was disrupted by the American Civil War in 1861, the Austin State Gazette said, "An acre of okra will produce seed enough to furnish a plantation with coffee in every way equal to that imported from Rio."

Greenish-yellow edible okra oil is pressed from okra seeds; it has a pleasant taste and odor, and is high in unsaturated fats such as oleic acid and linoleic acid. The oil content of some varieties of the seed is about 40%. At , the yield was exceeded only by that of sunflower oil in one trial. A 1920 study found that a sample contained 15% oil.

Industrial uses 
Bast fibre from the stem of the plant has industrial uses such as the reinforcement of polymer composites. The mucilage produced by the okra plant can be used for the removal of turbidity from wastewater by virtue of its flocculant properties. Having composition similar to a thick polysaccharide film, okra mucilage is under development as a biodegradable food packaging, as of 2018. A 2009 study found okra oil suitable for use as a biofuel.

Gallery

References

External links 

Igbo words and phrases
Abelmoschus
Asian vegetables
Tropical agriculture
Medicinal plants of Africa
Fiber plants
Pod vegetables
Crops originating from Africa
Cuisine of the Southern United States
African cuisine